The Mahaparinirvan Express is a tourist train which was launched by the Indian Railway Catering and Tourism Corporation (IRCTC) on 28 March 2007, to attract Buddhist pilgrims. The train takes passengers on an eight-day, seven-night spiritual tour which visits Buddhist sites across North India and Nepal.

History
The train gets its name from the Mahaparinirvana of the Buddha. A sacred journey which includes Buddha's visit to various important Buddhist pilgrimage sites, such as Lumbini, Bodhgaya, Varanasi and Kushinagar.

Features and Services
The Mahaparinirvan Express is operated by Indian Railways using carriages from a Rajdhani Express train. This is a fully air conditioned train offering three different classes of travel (first class, two tier, and three tier).

See also

Fairy Queen
Palace on Wheels
Royal Orient
Deccan Odyssey
Golden Chariot
Royal Rajasthan on Wheels
Maharajas' Express

References
 http://www.indianrail.gov.in/luxury_Train.html

External links
 Mahaparinirvan Express (Buddhist train circuit)  Named passenger trains of India

Religious tourism in India
Buddhism in India
2007 establishments in India
Tourism in Delhi
Rail transport in Delhi
Tourism in Uttar Pradesh
Rail transport in Bihar
Luxury trains in India
Railway services introduced in 2007
Transport in Rajgir
Transport in Varanasi
Transport in Gaya, India
Tourism in Bihar
Buddhist pilgrimages